Toby Nixon (born March 26, 1959) is an American politician in Washington. Nixon is serving as a member of the Kirkland City Council from Position 4 since 2012. Nixon is a former Republican member of Washington House of Representatives, representing the 45th district from 2002 to 2007.

He was appointed to a vacant House seat in 2002, and was elected as an incumbent in 2004. He served on the House Committee for State Government Operations and Accountability as a ranking member, and is known for his advocacy on behalf of open government. He also served on the Technology, Energy and Communications Committee and the Transportation Committee.

In the spring of 2006, Nixon announced that he would not be a candidate for re-election but instead that he would be running for the State Senate seat being vacated by retiring Senator Bill Finkbeiner. In November 2006, Nixon lost the race to Eric Oemig.

In November 2009, Nixon was elected with 65% of the vote to serve on the King County Fire Protection District No. 41.

Awards 
 2006 Freedom’s Light Award. Presented by The Washington Newspaper Publishers Association.
 2012 Heroes of the 50 States: The State Open Government Hall of Fame. Presented by National Freedom of Information Coalition and Society of Professional Journalist.
 2021 James Madison Award. Presented by Washington Coalition for Open Government.

Personal life 
Nixon's wife is Irene Nixon. They have five children. Nixon and his family live in Kirkland, Washington.

References

External links
 State Open Government Hall of Fame at nfoic.org

Campaign website

Living people
Republican Party members of the Washington House of Representatives
1959 births